Griswold House may refer to:

Griswold House (Sausalito, California), listed on the National Register of Historic Places (NRHP) in Marin County, California
Griswold House (Guilford, Connecticut), listed on the NRHP in New Haven County, Connecticut
Florence Griswold House, Old Lyme, Connecticut, now part of the Florence Griswold Museum
John N. A. Griswold House, Newport, Rhode Island, a National Historic Landmark and NRHP-listed in Newport County, Rhode Island